Wilmon Henry Sheldon (1875–1981) was a twentieth-century American philosopher.

Life and career

Sheldon was educated at Harvard University and taught at Yale.

Major works

References

20th-century American philosophers
American philosophy academics
Harvard University alumni
Yale University faculty
1875 births
1981 deaths